Phebe Mann Eur Ing CEng MICE FCIArb FRICS FRSA MCIOB FHEA is Chair of the Institution of Civil Engineers London. She is an Associate Professor in highway and transportation  at the University of East London. As a Chartered Civil Engineer, Chartered Surveyor, European Engineer, Chartered Construction Manager and Member of the Chartered Institute of Arbitrators, Mann, is the first woman engineer of minority ethnic origin appointed by the Lord Chancellor to the Upper Tribunal (Transport Jurisdiction), General Regulatory Chamber (Transport, Information Rights & Estate Agents Jurisdictions) and Agricultural Land Tribunal for Wales. Phebe is also the first and only woman to hold eight professional qualifications concurrently in the UK. She has been recognised with a Top 50 Women in Engineering Award (WE50) for her outstanding achievements in engineering.

Early life and education 
Mann achieved her City & Guilds Plumbing Qualification with distinctions in all the modules at The College of Haringey, Enfield and North East London. Mann's father was involved with Scouting. Mann holds many professional qualifications. She earned a master's degree in Computer Science from Hughes Hall, Cambridge. She was in the first ever cohort of University of Cambridge students studying Interdisciplinary Design for the Built Environment. She completed a master's degree at Loughborough University. She also holds a law degree from the University of Buckingham, LLM in Construction Law, Arbitration and Adjudication from the Robert Gordon University, a Masters in Bridge Engineering from University of Surrey, a postgraduate certificate in academic practice from Reading University and a Masters in Research Methods and PhD in Collaborative Design from the Open University.

Research and career 
Mann has made considerable contributions to engineering and legal education. Mann was the first woman to be elected chair of the Leicester Centre of the Chartered Institute of Building. She completed construction projects for City of Westminster and Cambridgeshire County Council. As an engineer, Mann worked on the Stump Cross for Four Went Ways, Little Venice and the A1 road. She won the 2011 WISE Campaign’s Women of Outstanding Achievement Tomorrow’s Leader Award. Mann was a member of the Honourable Society of Lincoln's Inn.

In June 2018, Mann completed a Bar Professional Training Course at City, University of London. She is a consultant at the Open University and lecturer at the University of Reading. Mann was made an Honorary Fellow of Bradford College in 2013.

She is a Talent2030 Hero. A portrait of Mann was commissioned in 2012 after she won the Tomorrow's Leader award, which she donated to Bradford College in 2012. She was listed as one of the United Kingdom's Top 50 Influential Women in Engineering in 2018. Mann is a leader with the Guide Association, and develops activities based on engineering to develop girls' confidence.

References 

English civil engineers
British women engineers
Alumni of Hughes Hall, Cambridge
Alumni of the University of Surrey
Transport engineers